John Wood Goddard (31 January 1920 – 22 October 1996) was a New Zealand rugby union player. A fullback, Goddard represented  at a provincial level, and was a member of the New Zealand national side, the All Blacks, on their 1949 tour of South Africa. He played eight matches for the All Blacks on that tour but, as the number two fullback behind Bob Scott, he did not appear in any of the Test matches.

Goddard died at Timaru on 22 October 1996, and was buried at Timaru Cemetery.

References

1920 births
1996 deaths
Rugby union players from Timaru
People educated at Timaru Boys' High School
New Zealand rugby union players
New Zealand international rugby union players
South Canterbury rugby union players
Rugby union fullbacks
Burials at Timaru Cemetery